The 1953 Bowling Green Falcons football team was an American football team that represented Bowling Green State University in the Mid-American Conference (MAC) during the 1953 college football season. In their 13th season under head coach Robert Whittaker, the Falcons compiled a 1–8 record (0–4 against MAC opponents), finished in last place in the MAC, and were outscored by all opponents by a combined total of 252 to 119.

The team's statistical leaders were Bill Bradshaw with 865 passing yards and 236 rushing yards, and Jim Ladd with 473 receiving yards. Ladd was also the team captain. Bill Bradshaw received the team's Most Valuable Player award.

Schedule

References

Bowling Green
Bowling Green Falcons football seasons
Bowling Green Falcons football